General Graham may refer to:

Sir Andrew Graham, 5th Baronet (born 1956), British Army lieutenant general
Charles K. Graham (1824–1889), Union Army brigadier general
Charles Passmore Graham (1927–2021), U.S. Army lieutenant general
Daniel O. Graham (1925–1995), U.S. Army lieutenant general
Douglas Graham (British Army officer) (1893–1971), British Army major general
Edward Graham (British Army officer) (1859−1951), British Army major general
Fortescue Graham (1794–1880), Royal Marines general
Frederick Graham (British Army officer) (1908–1988), British Army major general
Gerald Graham (1831–1899), British Army lieutenant general
Gordon M. Graham (1918–2008), U.S. Air Force lieutenant general
Henry V. Graham (1916–1999), U.S. Army National Guard general 
Howard Graham (Canadian Army officer) (1898–1986), Canadian Army lieutenant general
James Graham, 1st Marquess of Montrose (1612–1650), captain general of Scotland
John Graham (British Army officer, born 1923) (1923–2012), British Army major general
John Graham, 1st Viscount Dundee  (c. 1648–1689), Kingdom of Scotland major general
Miles Graham (1895–1976), British Army major general
Peter Graham (British Army officer) (born 1937), British Army lieutenant general
Samuel Graham (1756–1831), British Army lieutenant general
Stuart Clarence Graham (1920–1996), Australian Army major general
Thomas Graham, 1st Baron Lynedoch (1748–1843), British Army general
Wallace H. Graham (1910–1996), U.S. Air Force major general
William Graham (British Army officer) (died 1747), British Army brigadier general
William Montrose Graham (1834–1916), U.S. Army major general

See also
Attorney General Graham (disambiguation)